Wayne Evans (born 3 October 1974) is a former professional rugby league footballer who played in the 1990s, and 2000s. He played for the Melbourne Storm of the NRL. He also previously played for the Northern Eagles and Western Reds, as well as for the London Broncos in the Super League competition.

Early life
Evans was educated at St Gregory's College, Campbelltown, where he represented  1993 Australian Schoolboys.

Playing career
Recruited from South Tweed, Evans joined the Western Reds, making his debut in the 1995 ARL season. After the Reds were wound up at the end of the 1997 Super League season, Evans was signed by the newly formed Melbourne Storm.

Evans made his Melbourne Storm debut in round 4 of the 1998 NRL season against North Sydney Bears. Evans played just 12 games in the 1999 NRL season, missing the second half of the season due to back injuries, as the Storm went on to win the 1999 NRL Grand Final.

At the end of the 2000 NRL season Evans signed to play with the Northern Eagles, joining Storm  Brett Kimmorley transferring to the joint venture club. Evans ended his rugby league with the London Broncos at the end of the 2002 Super League season.

References

External links
Wayne Evans at rugbyleagueproject.org

1974 births
Living people
Australian rugby league players
Australian expatriate sportspeople in England
London Broncos players
Melbourne Storm players
Northern Eagles players
Rugby league props
Rugby league second-rows
Rugby league players from New South Wales
Western Reds players